Titra Studios aka Titan Productions is an American dubbing studio. The studio was responsible for dubbing numerous foreign films, including Mothra vs. Godzilla 1964 as well as the Speed Racer cartoon series (produced in Japan) and the original Ultraman TV series.

Among the many actors who worked for the studio were Peter Fernandez and the future Barney Miller star Hal Linden.

Film production companies of the United States
Dubbing studios